Karl Pallo (1896–1986) was a New Zealand importer, manufacturing engineer and businessman. He was born in Reinu, Estonia in 1896. He was an early supplier of petrol pumps to airports and became a manufacturer of pumps for service stations.

References

1896 births
1986 deaths
20th-century New Zealand businesspeople
Estonian emigrants to New Zealand
People from Saarde Parish